The Ribble and Alt Estuaries lie on the Irish Sea coast of the ceremonial counties of Lancashire and Merseyside in the traditional county of Lancashire in north-west England, and form the boundaries of a number of conservation schemes.

Protected area
A large number of different species of waders and wildfowl, listed below, use the estuaries as feeding and over-wintering areas. This wide variety of bird species has led to the estuaries being officially designated as a Special Protection Area and as a Ramsar site. The Ribble Estuary has been designated a Site of Special Scientific Interest since 1966 and is now covered by Natural England's Ribble Estuary National Nature Reserve.

The site
There are extensive areas of intertidal sand and silt flats, and expanses of saltmarsh. The mudflats have a large invertebrate fauna on which the waders and waterbirds feed. The saltmarshes are dominated by saltmarsh grass and red fescue with cord-grass on the seaward edge. The whole site is of great importance to internationally important numbers of wintering waterbirds.

Species
Birds that breed at the site include common tern (Sterna hirundo), lesser black-backed gull (Larus fuscus) and ruff (Philomachus pugnax). Migratory species that visit in spring and autumn include ringed plover (Charadrius hiaticula) and sanderling (Calidris alba).

Birds that over-winter here include bar-tailed godwit (Limosa lapponica), black-tailed godwit (Limosa limosa islandica), Bewick's swan (Cygnus columbianus bewickii), dunlin (Calidris alpina alpina), golden plover (Pluvialis apricaria), grey plover (Pluvialis squatarola), knot (Calidris canutus), oystercatcher (Haematopus ostralegus), pink-footed goose (Anser brachyrhynchus), pintail (Anas acuta), redshank (Tringa totanus), sanderling (Calidris alba), shelduck (Tadorna tadorna), teal (Anas crecca), whooper swan (Cygnus cygnus) and Eurasian wigeon (Anas penelope).

See also
 River Alt
 River Ribble

References

External links
 Natural England: Ribble Estuary National Nature Reserve

Ramsar sites in England
Special Protection Areas in England
Sites of Special Scientific Interest in Lancashire
Sites of Special Scientific Interest in Merseyside
Estuaries of England
Bodies of water of the Irish Sea